DJ Logic (born 1972 as Jason Kibler) is an American turntablist active primarily in nu-jazz/acid jazz and with jam bands.

Kibler was born and raised in The Bronx, NY. Because of an early interest in hip hop, Kibler started using the turntables, practicing often. Kibler was also interested in funk and jazz music and began collaborating with various musicians. His own recordings are perhaps best described as contemporary soul jazz with a strong hip hop feel.

Kibler often tours with his own group, Project Logic and has recorded or performed with Vernon Reid, moe., John Mayer, Medeski Martin & Wood, Bob Belden, Jack Johnson, Chris Whitley, Uri Caine, Christian McBride and others. On September 10 2001, Project Logic performed the final official show at Wetlands Preserve before the closing of the venue (this performance featured special guests Warren Haynes of The Allman Brothers Band and Gov't Mule, Stanley Jordan and Mike Gordon).  On April 6 2006, Kibler sat in with Bob Weir's Ratdog, adding his style to the famous Grateful Dead song combo "China Cat Sunflower/I Know You Rider". He is a founding member of The John Popper Project. On August 15 2009, Kibler sat in with O.A.R. at Madison Square Garden, adding his style to their latest single "This Town".

Jason Kiblers mentor had always been Vernon Reid, and the twosome recorded and toured occasionally as the “Yohimbe Brothers” with various guests. Kibler has appeared on studio and live performances with Reid's solo projects, Reid also did a guest solo on one track from Kiblers original band, Eye and I, which also featured D.K. Dyson and Melvin Gibbs, the latter of which has played on all of the DJ Logic solo releases as well.

Discography

Rise and Shine Remixes (2011) 

Sierra Leone's Refugee All Stars Meet DJ Logic

Released by Combacha

Track list

 Muloma Remix
 Jah Come Down Remix
 Jah Mercy Remix
 Global Threat Remix
 But Vange Remix

Zen of Logic (2006) 

DJ Logic

Released by Ropeadope Records

Track list

 Peace Y'All (I am in the House)
 9th Ward Blues
 Balifon Planet
 Hypnotic
 Interlude #1
 Simmer Slow
 Afro Beat
 One Time
 Something Distant
 Hope Road
 Smackness
 Interlude #2
 Rat Pack
 Holding Down

The John Popper Project (2004) 

The John Popper Project

Released by Relix Records

Track list

 Lapdance
 Everything
 All Good Children
 In The Midst
 Fire In Her Kiss
 Louisiana Sky
 Trigger
 Horses
 Took
 Morning Light
 Open Hand
 Show Me
 Pack Your Love

Longitude (2004) 

Groundtruther

Released by Thirsty Ear Recordings

Track list

 Transit of Venus
 Tycho Brahe
 March 1741, Cape Horn
 Course Made Good
 Dead Reckoning
 Medicean Stars
 Jupiter Mask
 H-4
 Back Quadrant
 Epherimedes
 Prime Meridian
 South Heading

The Tao of Yo (2004) 

Yohimbe Brothers

Released by Thirsty Ear Recordings

Track list

 Shine For Me
 The Secret Frequency
 More From Life
 Shape 4
 Noh Rio
 TV
 30 Spokes
 Unimportance
 No Pistolas
 Overcoming
 Words They Use
 Shape 1
 Perfect Traveller

Front End Lifter (2002) 

Yohimbe Brothers

Released by Ropeadope Records

Track list

 Ponk
 Tenemental
 6996-Club-Vohimbe
 Psychopathia Mojosexualis
 Welcome 2 The Freq Show
 Smoke and Dust Dub Version
 The Big Pill
 Bamalamb
 Transmission XXX
 Just A Little Screwy
 Invitation To A Situation
 Prelude To A Diss
 Innerspin (A Tone Hymn)
 The Callipygiac Caldonians
 That Obscure Object of Desire

The Anomaly (2001) 

DJ Logic

Released by Ropeadope Records

Track list

 French Quarter
 Black Buddah
 Ron’s House
 Michelle
 Frequency One
 Tih Gnob
 Bean-E-Man
 Who Am I?
 Soul-Kissing
 Afronautical
 The Project(s)
 Hip-Hopera
 An Interlude
 Miles Away
 Drone

Project Logic (1999) 

DJ Logic

Released by Ropeadope Records

Track list

 Intro
 Shea’s Groove
 Abyss
 Eyes Open (But Dead)
 Mnemonics
 Interlude 1
 Flat As Aboard
 Gig 1
 Interlude 2
 Una Cosa Buena
 Bag of Tricks
 J.J. Bailey
 Two Different Places
 Spider Dance
 Interlude 3
 Bruckner Boulevard
 Kinda Bleu

Appearances
With Wallace Roney
Prototype (HighNote, 2004)
With Christian McBride
Live at Tonic (Ropeadope, 2006)

References

External links
 Official site
 An interview with DJ Logic
 DJ Logic collection at the Internet Archive's live music archive
 For No One In Particular on Amulet
 Video interview with DJ Logic at allaboutjazz.com

1972 births
Living people
American hip hop DJs
Ropeadope Records artists
East Coast hip hop musicians
Musicians from the Bronx